Tenton Yenne (born 7 July 2000) is a Nigerian footballer who plays for Ararat-Armenia as a right winger.

Club career

FK Senica
Yenne made his Fortuna Liga debut for Senica against AS Trenčín on 20 July 2019, during the premier round of the season. Yenne was featured directly in the starting-XI and had spent a majority of the match on the pitch. He had impressed with two assists, contributing to a rather surprising 3:1 victory. He first crossed the ball to Eneji Moses, who equalised the score to 1:1. In second-half stoppage time, Yenne was fouled in the penalty area and Frank Castañeda had converted the penalty, sealing the score of the game, even though AS Trenčín were in the lead after the first half, thanks to former Slovak international David Depetris.

Yenne scored his first goal for Senica on 9 November 2019, during his 13th league appearance for the club. In a home fixture against Zemplín Michalovce he opened the scoresheet of the match after 54 minutes by converting a pass from Edmund Addo, commencing a fruitful half-time for Senica as, after further strikes from Frank Castañeda and Samson Akinyoola, they collected a 4:0 victory.

MŠK Žilina
On 21 January 2021, it was announced that Yenne had signed a three-year contract with multiple time Slovak champions MŠK Žilina. His move was a part of a swap deal when ex-Slovak under-21 international Martin Gamboš had moved to Senica.

Ararat-Armenia
On 7 July 2022, Ararat-Armenia announced the signing of Yenne.

Career statistics

Club

References

External links
 FK Senica official club profile 
 Futbalnet profile 
 
 

2000 births
Living people
Place of birth missing (living people)
Nigerian footballers
Nigerian expatriate footballers
Association football midfielders
FK Senica players
MŠK Žilina players
Noravank SC players
Slovak Super Liga players
Armenian Premier League players
Expatriate footballers in Slovakia
Nigerian expatriate sportspeople in Slovakia
Expatriate footballers in Armenia
Nigerian expatriate sportspeople in Armenia
Sportspeople from Jos